CambridgeSide (previously CambridgeSide Galleria) is an enclosed shopping mall in Cambridge, Massachusetts that opened in 1990. , the mall is anchored by TJ Maxx. Previous anchors include department stores Filene's, Lechmere, Macy's, Macy's Home and Children's, and Sears.

History 
The center was an outgrowth of the 1978 East Cambridge Riverfront Plan, which sought to revitalize the then-industrial district between Monsignor O'Brien Highway, Cambridge Parkway, and First Street. The east end of CambridgeSide is near the Museum of Science and the north end of CambridgeSide is near the MBTA Lechmere station on the Green Line E branch. It is also located along the Lechmere Canal off the Charles River.

In October 2018, it was announced that Sears would be closing in December 2018.

In January 2019, Macy's announced that the Macy's Home and Children's store would also be closing in mid-2019.

On December 27, 2020, Macy's closed permanently as part of a plan to close 46 stores nationwide. 

On May 14, 2022, it was announced that Best Buy would be closing on June 4, 2022 which will leave TJ Maxx as the only anchor left.

List of anchor stores

Notes 
 
 
 Community Development Department, City of Cambridge. East Cambridge Riverfront Plan. City of Cambridge, Massachusetts, 1978.

References

External links 
 

1990 establishments in Massachusetts
Buildings and structures in Cambridge, Massachusetts
Shopping malls established in 1990
Shopping malls in Massachusetts